Riervescemont is a commune in the Territoire de Belfort department in Bourgogne-Franche-Comté in northeastern France.

Sights and monuments
 Château du Rosemont, ruined castle.

See also

Communes of the Territoire de Belfort department

References

Communes of the Territoire de Belfort